Iryna Maystruk (born October 23, 1987) is a Ukrainian former swimmer, who specialized in breaststroke events. Maystruk qualified for the women's 200 m breaststroke at the 2004 Summer Olympics in Athens, by eclipsing a FINA B-cut of 2:32.85 from the European Junior Championships in Lisbon, Portugal. She challenged seven other swimmers in heat three, including top medal favorite Anne Poleska of Germany. She raced to sixth place by nearly 11 seconds behind winner Poleska in 2:37.42. Maystruk failed to advance into the semifinals, as she placed twenty-ninth overall in the preliminaries.

References

1987 births
Living people
Ukrainian female swimmers
Olympic swimmers of Ukraine
Swimmers at the 2004 Summer Olympics
Female breaststroke swimmers
Sportspeople from Kropyvnytskyi